Zanthoxylum deremense is a species of plant in the family Rutaceae. It is found in Malawi and Tanzania.

References

deremense
Vulnerable plants
Taxonomy articles created by Polbot